Vasily Aleksandrovich Orlov (Russian: Василий Александрович Орлов; born on 14 April 1975), is a Russian state political figure. He is currently the governor of the Amur Oblast since May 30, 2018.

Biography

Vasily Orlov was born on April 14, 1975, in the city of Blagoveshchensk.

Education

In 1998, he graduated from the Department of Chinese and English languages of the Philological Faculty of the Blagoveshchensk State Pedagogical University with the qualification of the teacher of Chinese and English languages, the referent-interpreter of the Chinese language.

In 2002, he received a diploma from the Department of State and Municipal Management of MGIMO in the specialty "state and municipal management" with knowledge of a foreign language with assignment of manager qualifications.

Entrepreneurial activity

From 2002 to 2007, he held the post of general director of the regional state unitary enterprise "Amur-quality".

From 2007 to 2008, the general director of OJSC Amur Crystal, engaged in the production of alcoholic beverages. He spoke in the media of the Amur region as an expert on issues relating to this type of product.

Political activity in Blagoveshchensk

On 27 March 2005, he was elected to the City Duma of Blagoveshchensk, IV convocation, in the district No. 9 as a self-nominated candidate with the result of 26.73% of the votes the voters who took part of.

In 2007, he joined the party "United Russia", as a member of the Amur regional party political council.

On 6 October 2008, Orlov took the post of deputy economics of the Mayor of Blagoveshchensk, Aleksandr Migulya. After his dismissal, the latter decided to resign, but he held that position until May 31, 2010.

On 11 March 2012, he was appointed as advisor to the head of the administration of Blagoveshchensk, Pavel Berezovsky.

Political activity in the Government of Amur Oblast

In August 2012, Orlov went to work in the government of the Amur Oblast. On 1 August 2012 he became deputy minister of economic development of the region.

On 28 May 2013, he was appointed Minister of Economic Development. On 28 September 2015, he was dismissed from this position in connection with the transition to a new job.

Work in the holding "Sibur Holding"

After dismissal from the post of minister of economic development of Priamurya, Orlov moved to work in the petrochemical holding "Sibur". There, he took the position of representative of the company's general director in the region, representing the interests of the holding, connected with the implementation of the project in the field of gas chemistry and gas processing.

In 2017, the management of SIBUR transferred Orlov to the staff training block in Moscow, where he became an adviser to the company's corporate university.

Work as personnel reserve of the Russian president

In December 2014, Vasily Orlov joined with Aleksandr Kozlov, (at that time the mayor of Blagoveshchensk), in the reserve of management personnel under the patronage of the Russian president. However, in the updated list of the reserve in 2016, Orlov was no longer listed, instead of him from Amur officials, in addition to Kozlov, the list included Deputy Governor of the Amur Region Andrey Donets.

Governor of Amur Oblast

On 30 May 2018, Russian President Vladimir Putin held a working meeting with Vasily Orlov. On that part, he announced the decision to appoint him, in connection with the early termination of the powers of the governor of the Amur region, Aleksandr Kozlov, temporarily acting as the governor of the Amur Oblast, issuing an appropriate decree.

Soon, he expressed his willingness to take part in the election of the governor of the region, which should be held 9 September 2018.

Family

He is married, and has two daughters (the oldest was born in 2004, the youngest was born in 2018).

Personal life

He is the author and performer of songs of his own composition.

References

1975 births
Living people
United Russia politicians
Governors of Amur Oblast